They Never Came Home is a 1968 mystery-thriller novel by Lois Duncan. The novel was nominated for an Edgar Allan Poe Award.

Plot
Teenage friends Larry and Dan go missing after embarking on a hiking trip. Upon investigation, a stranger claims that one of the boys owed him $2,000, prompting Joan, a sister of one of the boys, to begin her own search for them.

A second edition was published in 2012, updating the story to modern times.  Changes included references to cell phones and the Internet, as well as adjusting the money owed to $50,000.

Accolades
Nominated - Edgar Award, 1969

References

External links
They Never Came Home at Penguin Random House

1968 American novels
American thriller novels
American young adult novels
Novels about missing people
Novels by Lois Duncan
Doubleday (publisher) books